The 2017 Oceania Rugby Under 20s, was the third edition of the Oceania Rugby Junior Championship.

The Oceania Championship was played over three rounds in nine days, with New Zealand defeating Australia by 43–6 in the last match of the round-robin tournament on 6 May 2017, to take the title.

The Oceania Trophy was played as a two-match series between Fiji and Tonga, held in Lautoka, Fiji. Both matches finished as draws but Fiji, after securing a four-try bonus point in the second match, won the event.

Teams
The teams for the 2017 Oceania Rugby Under 20 tournaments were:

Championship

Trophy

Championship

Standings
Final competition table:
{| class="wikitable" style="text-align:center;"
|-
!width=175 |Team
!width=25 abbr="Played" |Pld
!width=25 abbr="Won" |W
!width=25 abbr="Drawn" |D
!width=25 abbr="Lost" |L
!width=32 abbr="Points for" |PF
!width=32 abbr="Points against" |PA
!width=32 abbr="Points difference" |PD
!width=25 abbr="Points" |Pts
|- bgcolor=ccffcc
|align=left|
| 3|| 3||0 ||0 ||186|| 32|| +154||15
|-
|align=left|
| 3||2 ||0 ||1 || 81|| 87||  −6|| 9
|-
|align=left|
| 3||1 ||0 ||2 || 82||152|| −70|| 5
|-
|align=left|
| 3|| 0|| 0||3 || 56||134|| −78|| 1
|-
|colspan="15"|Updated: 6 May 2017
Source: Oceania Rugby
|}
{| class="wikitable collapsible collapsed" style="text-align:center; line-height:100%; font-size:100%; width:50%;"
|-
! colspan="4" style="border:0px" |Competition rules
|-
| colspan="4" | Points breakdown:4 points for a win2 points for a draw1 bonus point for a loss by seven points or less 1 bonus point for scoring four or more tries in a matchClassification:Teams standings are calculated as follows:Most log points accumulated from all matchesMost log points accumulated in matches between tied teamsHighest difference between points scored for and against accumulated from all matchesMost points scored accumulated from all matches
|}

Round 1

Round 2

Round 3

Trophy
The Oceania Trophy was played in Lautoka, Fiji as a two-match series between Fiji and Tonga.

Standings
Final competition table:
{| class="wikitable" style="text-align:center;"
|-
!width=25 |#
!width=175 |Team
!width=25 abbr="Played" |Pld
!width=25 abbr="Won" |W
!width=25 abbr="Drawn" |D
!width=25 abbr="Lost" |L
!width=32 abbr="Points for" |PF
!width=32 abbr="Points against" |PA
!width=32 abbr="Points difference" |PD
!width=25 abbr="Points" |Pts
|- bgcolor=ccffcc
|- align=center |- style="background: #CCFFCC;"
|1||align=left| 
| 2||0||2||0||41||41||0||5
|- align=center
|2||align=left| 
| 2||0||2||0||41||41||0||4
|-
|colspan="10"|Updated: 2 December 2017
Source: Oceania Rugby
|}
{| class="wikitable collapsible collapsed" style="text-align:center; line-height:100%; font-size:100%; width:50%;"
|-
! colspan="4" style="border:0px" |Competition rules
|-
| colspan="4" | Points breakdown:4 points for a win2 points for a drawClassification:Teams standings are calculated as follows:Most log points accumulated from all matchesMost log points accumulated in matches between tied teamsHighest difference between points scored for and against accumulated from all matchesMost points scored accumulated from all matches
|}

Results

See also
2017 World Rugby Under 20 Championship
2017 World Rugby Under 20 Trophy

References

External links
Oceania Rugby website 

2017
2017 rugby union tournaments for national teams
2017 in Oceanian rugby union
2017 in Australian rugby union
2017 in New Zealand rugby union
2017 in Samoan rugby union
2017 in Fijian rugby union
Sports competitions on the Gold Coast, Queensland
2017 in youth sport
International rugby union competitions hosted by Australia